"A Very Silent Night" is a single released in New Zealand exclusively for dogs - created by creatives Colin Mitchell and Alex Dyer, now at rascals.co.nz. It is a world first as the single can not be heard by human ears and can only be heard by animals that can hear outside of the normal human range - including Dogs .  The single was sold during December 2007 to raise funds for the Royal New Zealand Society for the Prevention of Cruelty to Animals (SPCA). The music video for the song featured New Zealand artist Dei Hamo.
It reached number one on 24 December 2007 and became the New Zealand Christmas number one. The next week the song dropped from number 1 to number 16 in the chart.

Track listing
 "A Very Silent Night"
 "A Very Silent Night" (instrumental)

References

External links
Music video for "A Very Silent Night" on YouTube

2007 debut singles
Number-one singles in New Zealand
2007 songs